PS Speke was a British stern wheel paddle steamer in Uganda. She was built for the Uganda Railway in 1910 to operate on Lake Kyoga and the Victoria Nile. First and second class passengers travelled aboard the steamer but she also pushed a barge or lighter on which cargo and third class passengers travelled.

Speke was bought initially to operate part of what eventually became a rail, ship and road route between the Uganda Railway and Lake Albert. The first stage of this route was the Busoga Railway between Jinja and Lake Kyoga. The original lakeside terminus for the railway was Kikundu, but when that site was found unsuitable the terminus was moved a few miles north to Namasagali. Speke was the first vessel to operate the route across Lake Kyoga to Masindi, from where Albion cars later provided a road service to Lake Albert at Butiaba.

Although Speke began operating in 1910, delays in laying railway track delayed  completion of the Busoga Railway until 1913. All three Lake Kyoga vessels resembled typical Mississippi steamboats of the era. After Stanley entered service, Speke and her barges were used mainly to carry cotton for export from nearby plantations.

When the railway operator's successor, the East African Railways and Harbours Corporation (EARH), completed its northern Uganda extension from Tororo to Pakwach it superseded the Victoria Nile ferry service. EARH withdrew Speke, Stanley and Grant from service in 1962 and offered Speke for sale in September of that year. The track of the Busoga Railway was lifted in 1964.

References

1910 ships
Ferries of Uganda
Paddle steamers